Henry Coyle (died 29 May 1979) was a National Army officer and later a Cumann na nGaedheal politician.

He was elected at the 1923 general election to the 4th Dáil as Teachta Dála (TD) for Mayo North. In 1924, Coyle was sentenced to three years' imprisonment for bouncing cheques. Because his sentence was for more than six months, he was disqualified from the Oireachtas from 9 May 1924 under Section 51 of the Electoral Act 1923. The by-election caused by his disqualification was won by John Madden of Sinn Féin.

Coyle remains the only TD to have been disqualified in this way.

See also
List of members of the Oireachtas imprisoned since 1923

References

Year of birth missing
1979 deaths
Cumann na nGaedheal TDs
Members of the 4th Dáil
Politicians from County Mayo
National Army (Ireland) officers
Irish politicians convicted of crimes